is a former Japanese football player. She played for Japan national team.

Club career
Kioka was born in Shizuoka Prefecture on 22 November 1965. She played for her local club Shimizudaihachi SC until 1988. In 1989, she moved to Shimizu FC Ladies (later Suzuyo Shimizu FC Lovely Ladies). In 1989, the club won championship in L.League first season and from next season, won 2nd place for 4 years in a row until 1993 season. She was selected Best Eleven 3 times (1989, 1990 and 1995).

National team career
In June 1981, when Kioka was 16 years old, she was selected Japan national team for 1981 AFC Championship. At this competition, on 7 June, she debuted against Chinese Taipei. This match is Japan team first match in International A Match. She also played at 1986, 1989, 1993, 1995 AFC Championship, 1990, 1994 Asian Games. She was a member of Japan for 1991, 1995 World Cup and 1996 Summer Olympics. She played 75 games and scored 30 goals for Japan until 1996.

National team statistics

References

External links
 

1965 births
Living people
Association football people from Shizuoka Prefecture
Japanese women's footballers
Japan women's international footballers
Nadeshiko League players
Shimizudaihachi Pleiades players
Suzuyo Shimizu FC Lovely Ladies players
Asian Games medalists in football
Footballers at the 1990 Asian Games
Footballers at the 1994 Asian Games
1991 FIFA Women's World Cup players
1995 FIFA Women's World Cup players
Olympic footballers of Japan
Footballers at the 1996 Summer Olympics
Women's association football midfielders
Asian Games silver medalists for Japan
Medalists at the 1990 Asian Games
Medalists at the 1994 Asian Games